Scarfilm is a Belgian film production house.

History 
The Belgian director Gérald Frydman founded Scarfilm in 1976 to produce his own films, after remarked ones.

In 2014, for Scarfilm it's a new start with a new production team to develop films, music video, commercials and corporate video.

Filmography 
"Agulana" (1976) won a prize in Cannes Film Festival in 1976
"L'immortel"(1981)
"Last Cut"(1982)
"That's all Folks"(1984)
"Les Effaceurs"(1991)
"J'ai eu dur"(1996)
"Arthur Masson, l'homme qui écrivait des livres"(documentary)(2001)
"La Séquence Sylverstein"(2003)
"Porteur d'eau"(2004) directed by Carlos Rendón Zipagauta
"Battle" (2008)
"One Last Time" (2010)
"Strangers" (2011)
"Lipstick" (2012)
"In Exequiel" (2013)
"La Graine" (2015)

See also 
 Palme d'or (Le Cheval de Fer directed by Gérald Frydman won the Short Film Palme d'Or at the 1984 Cannes Film Festival)

References

External links 
 

Film production companies of Belgium
Entertainment companies established in 1976
Mass media companies established in 1976
1976 establishments in Belgium
Companies based in Brussels